Public Cowboy may refer to:

Public Cowboy #1 
 Public Cowboy No. 1, a 1937 Western film with Gene Autry
 Public Cowboy No. 1 (album), a 1996 album by Western band Riders in the Sky

See also
 Gene Autry